Laramie is a 1949 American Western film directed by Ray Nazarro and written by Barry Shipman. The film stars Charles Starrett, Fred F. Sears, Tommy Ivo, Elton Britt and Smiley Burnette. The film was released on May 19, 1949, by Columbia Pictures.

Plot
Steve Holden is brought in to be a mediator to bring peace between the US Cavalry and the Indians. A local businessman is against the idea so he can continue to sell large amounts of rifles to the warring tribes. He uses the Regiment's Scout Cronin to assassinate the Indian chief and stir up a war. The film's climax reuses the stagecoach attack footage from Stagecoach (1939).

Cast          
 Charles Starrett as Steve Holden / The Durango Kid
 Smiley Burnette as Smiley Burnette
 Fred F. Sears as Col. Ron Dennison 
 Tommy Ivo as Ronald Dennison Jr.
 Elton Britt as the Singing Sergeant
 Robert J. Wilke as Scout Cronin 
 Jim Diehl as L.D. Brecker
 Myron Healey as Lieutenant Reed 
 Jay Silverheels as Running Wolf

References

External links
 

1949 films
1940s English-language films
American Western (genre) films
1949 Western (genre) films
Columbia Pictures films
Films directed by Ray Nazarro
American black-and-white films
1940s American films